Jang Yeong-sil is a 2016 South Korean historical drama television series starring Song Il-gook, Kim Yeong-cheol, Kim Sang-kyung and Park Sun-young. It replaced The Jingbirok: A Memoir of Imjin War and aired on KBS1 from January 2, 2016 to March 26, 2016 on Saturdays and Sundays at 21:40 (KST) for 24 episodes.

Plot
A television series talk about Jang Yeong-sil, a popular scientist of Joseon in the 15th century. Born as a slave but with the remarkable talent and the profound passion for astronomy, he was known by King Sejong and was recommended to the court. Jang Yeong-sil had a lot of contributions for the science-technology of Joseon, he has left many great inventions such as the water clock, the sundial, the astronomical instruments, the rain gauge and also many research on weaponry.

Cast

Main characters
Song Il-kook as Jang Yeong-sil (or Jang Young-sil)
Jung Yoon-seok as young Jang Yeong-sil
Kim Sang-kyung as Yi Do, later King Sejong the Great (1397~1450)
 as young Yi Do
Kim Yeong-cheol as Yi Bang-won, later King Taejong (1367~1422)
Park Sun-young as Princess Sohyun – King Taejong's daughter and Yi Do's older sister (fictional character)
Yoon Si-yeong as young Sohyun

Supporting characters

Royal household
Kim Ki-hyeon as King Taejo
 as Prince Yangnyeong
Kim Bo-mi as Princess Gyeonghye
Han Jeong-woo as King Munjong
Choi Seung-hoon as young Yi Hyang (later King Munjong)
Choi Dong-ah as King Danjong
 as King Sejo

Court officials
 as 
Son Byong-ho as 
Jung Han-yong as Hwang Hui
Kim Byung-ki as 
 as 
 as 
 as 
 as Jeong Heum-ji
 as Jeong In-ji
Park Seung-gyu as 
 as Kim Goo-nam
 as 
 as Choe Manri

Seoungwan people
 as 
Seo Hyun-chul as Choi Bok (fictional character)
Im Hyuk as Yoo Taek-sang
 as Jeon Bae-cheon (fictional character)
Lee Joo-hyun as Ji Gyeong-chan (fictional character)
 as Sung Sa-gook (fictional character)

Dongraehyeon people
Lee Ji-hoon as Jang Hee-je (fictional character)
 as young Jang Hee-je
 as Jang Sung-hwi – a Goryeo's scientist, minister and Jang Yeong-sil's father
Kim Ae-ran as Eun-wol – a Kisaeng and Jang Yeong-sil's mother (assumed character)
 as Jang Gi-bae (fictional character)
Kang Sung-jin as Seok-goo – Jang Yeong-sil's best friend (fictional character)
Lee Joon-seo as young Seok-goo
 as Kim Hak-joo – a noble and Jang Hee-je's friend (fictional character)
Lee Kye-in as young Kim Hak-joo

Hanyang people
 as Eul-seon (Chinese: 乙善; Pinyin: Yǐ Shàn) – princess Sohyun's maid, later Seok-goo's wife
N/A as Oh Goo-san
 as Han Nae-gwan
 as Uhm Sang-goong

Ming dynasty
 as Joo Tae-kang (Chinese: 朱太江; Pinyin: Zhū Tàijiāng) – a Ming dynasty old prince (fictional character)
Park Gyu-ri as Joo Bu-ryeong (Chinese: 朱副伶; Pinyin: Zhū Fùlíng) – Tae-kang's daughter (fictional character)
 as  – a Joseon person working as a eunuch in Ming dynasty
Kwon Bin as Zhengtong Emperor

Extended cast
 as Go Gil-soo – a trader between Joseon and Ming dynasty (fictional character)
 as Byun Dae-chi
 as Choi Yool
Jang Gwang as Jo Gwang
 as Moo-san
 as Oh Pil-gyo
N/A as Bae Kang-choon
Cha Ye-joon as Im Myung-deok
Oh Ji-hyuk as Yoo Cheol
Cha Bo-sung as Sung Sam-moon

Kim Moon-sik
Shin Chi-young
Jo Shin-geun
Jo Yeon-ho
Hwang Bi-ho
Lee Ho-yool
Lee Joo-yeon

Cameo appearances
 as Jang Sung-bae – Jang Sung-hwi's oldest brother
 as Kim Beob-rae
Yeo Hoe-hyun as Na Ki-soon
Song Triplets as three little beggars

Ratings
In the table below, the blue numbers represent the lowest ratings and the red numbers represent the highest ratings.

Remark

Original soundtrack

Awards and nominations

References

External links
  
 
 
 

Korean Broadcasting System television dramas
2016 South Korean television series debuts
2016 South Korean television series endings
Korean-language television shows
Television series by KBS Media
Television series based on actual events
Television series set in the Joseon dynasty
South Korean historical television series